IGM may refer to:

 Initiative on Global Markets, at the University of Chicago Booth School of Business 
 IG Metall, German metalworkers' union
 IGM Financial, Canada
 Institut Gaspard Monge, at the University of Marne la Vallée
 International Grandmaster, a chess title
 Intergalactic medium
 Kingman Airport (Arizona) (IATA Code: IGM)
 Istituto Geografico Militare, Italian national mapping agency
Intersex genital mutilation

Medicine
Immunoglobulin M, an antibody